Vkt or VKT may mean:

 Vakarų Kompiuteriniai Tinklai, Western Computer Networks
 Всероссийская конфедерация труда, the All-Russian Confederation of Labour
 VKT-line, a Finnish defence line during the World War II.
 Standard abbreviation for Vuokatti railway station in Finland.
 Vehicle Kilometers Traveled.
 Vestfold Kollektivtrafikk, the public transport authority for Vestfold, Norway
 IATA airport code for Vorkuta Airport
 VKT - Valtion Kivääritehdas, the Finnish State Arsenal located in Jyväskylä. 1951 it went into the Valmet conglomerate.